Zhengfa Yanzang (Hànyǔ Pīnyīn: Zhèngfǎ Yǎnzàng; Rōmaji: Shōbōgenzō), known in English as the Treasury of the Correct Dharma Eye or by the Japanese reading of its title, Shōbōgenzō, is a collection of kōans compiled by Dahui Zonggao. Dahui was a famous popularizer of kōans during the Song Dynasty in China. Dahui's collection is composed of three scrolls prefaced by three short introductory pieces. Dahui's work uses the same Chinese characters for its title as the now well known Shōbōgenzō written by the Japanese monk Eihei Dōgen in the thirteenth century. Upon arriving in China, Dōgen first studied under Wuji Lepai, a disciple of Dahui, which is where he probably came into contact with Dahui's Zhengfa Yanzang. In his book Dogen's Manuals of Zen Meditation, the modern scholar Carl Bielefeldt acknowledges that Dōgen likely took the title from Dahui for his own kōan collection, the Shinji Shōbōgenzō, and kept it for his later and now most well-known work, the Kana Shōbōgenzō (usually referred to simply as "the Shōbōgenzō"):  Indeed the fact that Dōgen styled his effort "Shōbō genzō" suggests that he had as his model a similar compilation of the same title by the most famous of Sung masters, Ta-Hui Tsung-kao Dahui Zonggao.

References

External links
 Full Text of Original, Xuzangjing Vol. 67, No. 1309, Chinese Buddhist Electronic Text Association,

12th-century Chinese books
Zen texts
Zen koan collections
Chinese Buddhist texts
Song dynasty literature